West Virginia's 12th Senate district is one of 17 districts in the West Virginia Senate. It is currently represented by Republicans Ben Queen and Patrick Martin. All districts in the West Virginia Senate elect two members to staggered four-year terms.

Geography
District 12 covers all of Braxton, Clay, Harrison, and Lewis Counties and parts of Gilmer County in the center of the state. Communities within the district include Clarksburg, Bridgeport, Salem, Shinnston, Stonewood, Nutter Fort, Despard, Clay, Sutton, Glenville, and Weston.

The district overlaps with West Virginia's 1st and 2nd congressional districts, and with the 32nd, 33rd, 34th, 46th, and 48th districts of the West Virginia House of Delegates.

Recent election results

2022

Historical election results

2020

2018

2016

2014

2012

Federal and statewide results in District 12

References

12
Braxton County, West Virginia
Clay County, West Virginia
Gilmer County, West Virginia
Harrison County, West Virginia
Lewis County, West Virginia